Selania leplastriana, the Leplastrier's piercer, is a moth of the family Tortricidae. It is found in most of southern Europe except the Balkan Peninsula. It is also found in the Near East and North Africa.

The wingspan is about 13 mm. Adults are on wing in July. They are day flyers.

The larvae feed in the stems of Brassica oleracea, where the only sign of their presence is a small amount of frass ejected from the feeding area.

External links
UKMoths
Fauna Europaea

Grapholitini
Moths of Europe
Moths of Asia